Spanaway is a census-designated place (CDP) in Pierce County, Washington, United States. The population was 35,476 at the 2020 census, up from 27,227 in 2010. Spanaway is an unincorporated area near Tacoma, and is often identified together with the more urban, less wealthy Parkland.

Spanaway's main business thoroughfare is Pacific Avenue South, which is a north–south road that coincides with State Route 7 through the Spanaway area.

History

The Hudson's Bay Company, headquartered at Fort Nisqually, had control of this region until 1863. Company maps and journals show the company's subsidiary, the Pugets Sound Agricultural Company, raised cattle, grain, and sheep at "Spanueh Station" on the south and east shores of "Spanueh Lake." Spanueh is the Hudson Bay Company's spelling of the native Lushootseed spadue, which means "dug roots" referring to an area where camas and other edible roots can be found. Lushootseed underwent a loss of nasal consonants in the 1800s, so "Spanueh" simply transcribes an older pronunciation of what is now "Spadue".

The first white settler to take a donation claim by the lake, Henry de la Bushalier, tried to rename the lake after himself.  That faded away with his death one year later. In 1890 the area was renamed "Lake Park" as a planned community by the Lake Park Land, Railway and Improvement Company, which bought all the nearby land east of the lake and built a rail line to its "recreation mecca" on the shore of "Spanaway Lake." When Mount Rainier National Park was established in 1899, tourists would take the train to its terminus in Lake Park and from there make the two-day journey to Mount Rainier, making Spanaway the original "gateway" to Mount Rainier. The journey was made by stagecoach, with an overnight stop in Eatonville; the route was in operation as early as 1893.

Although the U.S. Board on Geographic Names recognized the community of "Lake Park" in 1897, it had to very belatedly reverse its decision in 1970 to accept common usage: Spanaway (Spanueh).

In the 21st century, several attempts were made to incorporate Spanaway and neighboring communities into a city.

Geography
According to the United States Census Bureau, the CDP has a total area of 8.7 square miles (22.6 km2), of which, 8.3 square miles (21.6 km2) of it is land and 0.4 square miles (1.0 km2) of it (4.25%) is water.

Surrounding communities

Demographics

As of the census of 2000, there were 21,588 people, 7,659 households, and 5,820 families residing in the CDP. The population density was 2,592.0 people per square mile (1,000.6/km2). There were 7,963 housing units at an average density of 956.1/sq mi (369.1/km2). The racial makeup of the CDP was 71.13% White, 9.11% African American, 1.61% Native American, 6.34% Asian American, 2.12% Pacific Islander, 2.15% from other races, and 7.55% from two or more races.

There were 7,659 households, out of which 40.4% had children under the age of 18 living with them, 57.1% were married couples living together, 13.6% had a female householder with no husband present, and 24.0% were non-families. 18.2% of all households were made up of individuals, and 4.8% had someone living alone who was 65 years of age or older. The average household size was 2.82 and the average family size was 3.17.

In the CDP, the age distribution of the population shows 30.0% under the age of 18, 8.4% from 18 to 24, 32.7% from 25 to 44, 21.5% from 45 to 64, and 7.3% who were 65 years of age or older. The median age was 33 years. For every 100 females, there were 99.3 males. For every 100 females age 18 and over, there were 96.2 males.

The median income for a household in the CDP was $46,210, and the median income for a family was $50,076. Males had a median income of $35,525 versus $26,758 for females. The per capita income for the CDP was $17,928. About 7.8% of families and 10.8% of the population were below the poverty line, including 15.5% of those under age 18 and 7.3% of those age 65 or over.

Notable people
 Mike Blowers, MLB baseball player
 Jerry Cantrell, Alice In Chains guitarist
 Jacob Castro, soccer player
 Derrike Cope, NASCAR driver
 Jo Koy, stand-up comedian
 Rick Story, Ultimate Fighting Championship fighter

Education
Public schools in Spanaway are part of the Bethel School District:

Elementary schools
 Camas Prairie Elementary School
 Centennial Elementary School
 Clover Creek Elementary School
 Evergreen Elementary School (2018 National Blue Ribbon Award Winning School)
 Naches Trail Elementary School
 Pioneer Valley Elementary School
 Shining Mountain Elementary School
 Spanaway Elementary School
 Thompson Elementary School

Junior high schools
 Bethel Middle School
 Cedarcrest Middle School
 Liberty Middle School
 Spanaway Middle School
 Cougar Mountain Middle School

High schools
 Bethel High School
 Challenger Secondary School
 Spanaway Lake High School

Private schools
 Bethel Baptist Christian School (grades K4-12)
 Elk Plain School of Choice (elementary grades)

Nearby postsecondary schools
 Pacific Lutheran University (Parkland)
 Colleges in Tacoma
 Colleges in Lakewood
 Colleges in Puyallup
 Colleges offering courses at Joint Base Lewis-McChord

References

External links

Pierce County - Information about the Parkland-Spanaway-Midland Communities Plan
 Spanaway Water Company

Census-designated places in Pierce County, Washington
Census-designated places in Washington (state)